This is a list of statistics for the 2022 T20 Asia Cup.

Team statistics

Highest team totals 
The following table lists the ten highest team scores during this tournament.

Batting statistics

Most runs 
The top ten highest run scorers (total runs) in the tournament are included in this table.

Highest scores 
This table contains the top ten highest scores of the tournament made by a batsman in a single innings.

Bowling records

Most wickets

Best bowling figures

Most maidens

Fielding Statistics

Most dismissals 
This is a list of wicket-keepers with the most dismissals in the tournament.

Most catches

Partnership records

By wicket

By runs

References

External links 

 Series home at ESPNcricinfo

Asia Cup
International cricket competitions in 2022
Asia Cup statistics
August 2022 sports events in Asia